The House of Vizarrón (Spanish: La Casa Vizarrón o de las Cadenas) is a house located in El Puerto de Santa María, Spain. It was declared Bien de Interés Cultural in 2006.

References

See also 
 List of Bien de Interés Cultural in the Province of Cádiz

Bien de Interés Cultural landmarks in the Province of Cádiz
Houses in Spain